The Arab Strategy Forum is an annual conference, held in Dubai, United Arab Emirates (UAE). The Forum aims to be a platform for public and private sector leaders to develop future strategies, particularly with a focus on the coming year.

Launch 
Launched in 2004, originally as a biennial three-day event titled the Dubai Strategy Forum, the Forum was conceived to promote debate on policy in the Arab world. It was renamed the Arab Strategy Forum in 2006. The keynote address at the inaugural forum was given by former US President Bill Clinton. It was relaunched in 2009 under the Mohammed bin Rashid Al Maktoum Foundation.

Currently managed by The Executive Office of the Ruler of Dubai, Sheikh Mohammed bin Rashid Al Maktoum, the event sets out to enable leaders to make strategically informed decisions, navigate risks and exploit opportunities. A one-day event, its theme is typically set by examining predictions for the year ahead both in the Arab and wider world.

Content 
The Forum has frequently provided headline-grabbing insights. In 2015 it published a report costing the Arab Spring at $833.7 billion (attributing this to losses in GDP, drops in tourism; stock and financial market losses and drops in Foreign Direct Investment). In 2016, addressing the forum, Leon Panetta, former director of the CIA and former US Secretary of Defence, together with former British Prime Minister David Cameron, jointly called for a regional alliance against terrorism. Panetta asserted such a coalition “could be a powerful signal to Iran that it can’t go into countries as it did in Yemen and Syria.”
The forum has often hosted contradictory views. In 2015 former British Foreign Secretary William Hague pointed to the growing threat of Daesh, while in 2014 Francis Fukuyama claimed the threat posed by the group had been overblown by media and the US. In 2018 both former French President Francois Hollande and former US Defense Secretary Robert Gates used the Forum as a platform to roundly condemn the US decision to open an embassy in Jerusalem.

The Forum also produces a number of reports annually.

References 

Events in Dubai
International conferences in the United Arab Emirates